Mohamed Mir (born 24 August 1963) is an Algerian former cyclist. He competed in the road race at the 1988 Summer Olympics.

References

External links
 

1963 births
Living people
Algerian male cyclists
Olympic cyclists of Algeria
Cyclists at the 1988 Summer Olympics
Place of birth missing (living people)
20th-century Algerian people